"Violent and Lazy" is the fourth single by Grinspoon from their second studio album Easy. It was released on 13 November 2000 on the Grudge label (the Australian imprint of Universal Records), which peaked at No. 15 on the ARIA Alternative Singles Chart.

Grinspoon guitarist Pat Davern describes the song as being "probably the least heavy song on Easy. We thought we’d release three really rock singles off the record first. This one’s maybe a bit more positive than the other, dirtier songs." The band's drummer, Kristian Hopes, however describes it as being one "of the heavier songs on the album". Sputnik Music said that "Violent And Lazy shows the ability of the Spoon to write a marketable, catchy Rock song".

"Violent and Lazy" was the only single which did not appear on the band's 2005 compilation album, Best in Show. The single includes tracks remixed by Ben Rosen, "Better off Dead"; Gerling, "Violent and Lazy (Hey Kids Do You Love Jesus?)"; Jonathan Burnside, "Violent and Lazy (Burnside Remix)"; and Jonboyrock, "Ready 1 (Jonboyrock Remix).

Track listing

References

2000 singles
Grinspoon songs
1999 songs
Songs written by Phil Jamieson
Universal Records singles